Love Me Baby may refer to:

"Love Me Baby" (Sheila and B. Devotion song), 1977
"Love Me Baby" (Praga Khan song)

See also
Rock Me Baby (disambiguation)